Colmenar del Arroyo is a municipality of the autonomous community of Madrid in central Spain. It belongs to the comarca of Las Vegas.

References

Municipalities in the Community of Madrid